Hippurites atheniensis is an extinct species of fossil saltwater clam, a marine bivalve mollusk in the family Hippuritidae. These fossils occur in the Late Cretaceous deposits of Greece, Serbia, Dalmatia, Istria, Bosnia and Herzegovina, Slovenia, Bulgaria and Italy.

References
 Global Names Index
Sepkoski's Online Genus Database
R. Cestaria - 1995 -  Revista Mexicana de Ciencias Geológicas

Hippuritidae
Prehistoric bivalves
Cretaceous bivalves
Molluscs described in 1907
Fossils of Serbia